Bridge River Delta Provincial Park is a provincial park in British Columbia, Canada, located  north of Pemberton and  west of Lillooet.

External links
Backgrounder

Provincial parks of British Columbia
2010 establishments in British Columbia